Central Pendam is a village located in the Tehsil of Gangtok of Sikkim, India.

Demographics
According to the 2011 Indian census, the average sex ratio of the village is 966 which is higher than Sikkim state average of 890.

Administration
Sarpanch is the administrative head of the village and representative of the town according to the Constitution of India and Panchayati Raj Act.

Education
Government Senior Secondary School Central Pendam is a school located in the town of Central Pendam

Banking facilities
Indian Overseas Bank operates a branch at Central Pendam.

References

Villages in Pakyong district
 Pakyong district